Mission Creek (from Spanish: misión) is a river in San Francisco, California. Once navigable from the Mission Bay inland to the vicinity of Mission Dolores, where several smaller creeks converged to form it, Mission Creek has long since been largely culverted. Its only remaining portion above-ground is the Mission Creek Channel which drains into China Basin.

The two Ramaytush Indian villages of Chutchui and Sitlintac were located on Mission Creek.

Background
Declared by the state legislature in 1854 to be a navigable stream, it retains the designation today, even though most of it was vacated for use by boats in 1874 and later filled in.

Soil liquefaction, such as that which killed numerous people in the 1906 San Francisco earthquake, has been known to occur along buried portions of the creek.

The China Basin Building was erected on the creek's north bank in the 1920s and used for off-loading and processing bananas through the 1950s. In the 1970s it was known as the Del Monte Building and used as a food distribution site by the Hearst family in response to the demands of the SLA.

A community of house boats has existed along the creek's south bank since 1960 when the state of California moved the houseboat community there from Islais Creek to make way for merchant ship trading.

The mouth of Mission Creek has been known to Major League Baseball fans as McCovey Cove ever since the year 2000 when the San Francisco Giants relocated from their former home at  Candlestick Park to Oracle Park on the creek's north bank. Balls hit over the right field wall splash-land in the water there.

Lake Dolores
The Laguna Dolores was fed by the creek.  It was the site of the original Mission Dolores, and probably stretched between Mission Street and Valencia, and 20th and 16th streets before being filled in with sand.

References

Bibliography

External links
 Vanished Waters of Southeastern San Francisco by William Crittenden Sharpsteen
Water Water by Chris Carlsson
Mission Creek by Chris Carlsson

Rivers of San Francisco
Mission District, San Francisco
Subterranean rivers of the United States
Rivers of Northern California
Tributaries of San Francisco Bay